Joseph Okezie (born 1 May 1937) is a Nigerian boxer. He competed in the men's featherweight event at the 1960 Summer Olympics.

References

External links
 

1937 births
Living people
Nigerian male boxers
Olympic boxers of Nigeria
Boxers at the 1960 Summer Olympics
People from Umuahia
Featherweight boxers